Tultitlán is a commuter railway station serving the Ferrocarril Suburbano, a suburban rail that connects the State of Mexico with Mexico City. The station is located in the municipality of Tultitlán, State of Mexico, north of Mexico City.

General information
Tultitlán station is located in the La Cocila neighborhood in Tultitlán and it is the sixth station of the system going northbound from Buenavista.

Like with Lechería station, Central American and Mexican migrants can be found near Tultitlán station.

History
Tultitlán station was opened on 5 January 2009 as part of the second stretch of system 1 of the Ferrocarril Suburbano, going from Buenavista in Mexico City to Cuautitlán station in the State of Mexico.

Station layout

References

2009 establishments in Mexico
Tultitlán
Railway stations opened in 2009
Tultitlán
Buildings and structures in the State of Mexico